The Maimana Khanate (Dari: خانات میمنه, Uzbek: میمنه خنليغى) was an Uzbek Khanate in Northern Afghanistan centered around the town of Maimana. It was founded in 1747 with the death of Nader Shah. The Mings had been the governors of Maimana since 1621. Hajji Bi Ming was the first independent ruler of the khanate. After the death of Ahmad Khan in 1814, Sar-i Pul seceded from the khanate. In the 1830s Sar-i Pul took the district of Gurziwan from Maimana. The Aimaq tribes of the Murghab broke away from Maimana by 1845. In 1847 and 1850 it resisted attempts by the Emirate of Herat to annex it. In 1875 the khanate rebelled against Afghanistan but it was crushed and the city sacked. In 1892 the khanate was annexed by Afghanistan.

History

Invasion by Yar Mohammad Khan 
In 1844, the rulers of the Chahar Wilayat broke out into open war again. Mizrab Khan of Maimana and Rustam Khan of Sheberghan mounted a joint attack on the new ruler of Andkhui, Ghazanfar Khan. Ghazanfar was overthrown and his uncle, Sufi Khan, was installed as the new ruler. Ghazanfar fled to Bukhara and agreed to pay tribute if Nasrullah Khan would restore him to the throne of Andkhui. Nasrullah agreed and sent Ghazanfar to the Mir Wali of Khulm (who was an ally of Bukhara). Mir Wali was eager to settle old scores. Aided by the Ishans of Balkh and Mazar-i Sharif, Mir Wali marched into the Chahar Wilayat. Sar-i Pul defected and attacked Shebarghan. Rustam Khan requested help from Mizrab Khan, however, in early 1845, Mizrab Khan died after he was poisoned by one of his wives. As a result, his two sons (Hukumat Khan and Sher Mohammad Khan) not only made a truce with each other but also supported Bukhara's invasion. Therefore, Shebarghan was annexed by Sar-I Pul and Ghazanfar Khan was re-instated as the ruler of Andkhui. However, Ghazanfar refused to pay tribute to Bukhara and as a result Nasrullah supported Rustam Khan in recapturing Sherbarghan and deposing Ghazanfar Khan (once more re-instating Sufi Khan as head of the Andkhui Afshars).

At the same time, the truce between Hukumat Khan and Sher Mohammad Khan broke down and the two fought for control of Maimana. Yar Mohammad Khan intervened and temporarily settled the dispute. Sher Mohammad was given control of Maimana while Hukumat Khan would control agriculture and mercantile trade, effectively becoming Sher Mohammad's diwanbegi. In addition to this, Yar Mohammad also attempted to create two Tajik battalions in the hopes that they would be more loyal to Herat.

In the Summer of 1847, Hukumat Khan requested assistance against Sher Mohammad Khan, becoming the pretext for war Yar Mohammad needed. Yar Mohammad marched against Maimana with 20,000 troops (half of those being composed of Aimaq and Turkmen tribesmen eager for loot). When the army reached Chichaktu (on the frontier between Herat and Maimana), it quickly fell and the town was sacked. When Hukumat Khan heard of this, he quickly rushed to tender his submission and provided the army with supplies, preventing the Heratis from doing the same to other regions of Maimana. Yar Mohammad also punished the looters by amputating their noses and ears even though it was quite obvious he had sanctioned the sacking.

They soon marched on Sher Mohammad Khan's stronghold of Khairabad and the fortress was torn apart. Sher Mohammad initially fled and eventually reconciled with his brother. Ghazanfar Khan of Andkhui also requested Yar Mohammad Khan's aid in overthrowing Sufi Khan. Sufi Khan was put to death and Andkhui was subjected to a brutal sacking. Yar Mohammad intended to continue his advance to Aqcha and Balkh even though it was in the winter. He swiftly occupied Aqcha but failed to take Sheberghan and was forced to retreat to Maimana. The population refused to open their gates, so Hukumat Khan guided the army through a route going around the capital. The march back to Bala Morghab was devastating and many Herati soldiers died due to the cold or hunger. Yar Mohammad Khan returned to Herat in late February or Early March 1848, and attempted to recover from the defeat.

In November 1849, Yar Mohammad demanded Hukumat Khan to pay tribute to Herat. When this offer was refused, Maimana was besieged with a force of 6,000 men and the city was surrounded for 11 months. However, Maimana continued to hold out and it was detrimental to Herat's future as an independent state. In 1849 and 1850, the Barakzais had already incorporated significant parts of Afghan Turkestan into their kingdom, and if all of the region was to fall then Herat could be simultaneously attacked from Maimana and Qandahar. The siege of Maimana also helped the Barakzais because it made sure that Maimana's powerful army wouldn't come to the aid of the petty states of the region. Eventually, in September 1850, the siege of Maimana was lifted and Yar Mohammad Khan returned in defeat to Herat.

Rulers 
The following is a list of rulers of the Maimana Khanate according to Johnathan Lee's book.

 Ataliq Uraz Ming bin Baruti Bi (1612 - 30/1653 - 56)
 Hajji Bi Khan Ming (1731 - 1772)
 Jan Khan (1772 - 1795)
 In 1795 Jan Khan was briefly succeeded by his eldest son, however the name is not given.
 Mohammad Rahim Khan (1795 - 1804)
 Ataliq Ahmad Qoli Khan (1804 - 1814)
 Ali Yar Khan (1814 - 1830)
 In 1830 an unnamed Persian regent governed the khanate before being deposed.
 Abd al-Mu'min Khan (1830–31)
 Mizrab Khan (1831 - 1845)
 Hukumat Khan and Sher Mohammad Khan (1845–48)
 Hukumat Khan (1845-1862)
 Mohammad Husain Khan bin Mizrab Khan (1862 - March 1876)
 From March 1876 to February 1879 the Maimana Khanate was annexed into Afghanistan and Afghan governors were appointed.
 Mohammad Husain Khan (February - May 1879)
 From May to November 1879 the khanate was again annexed into Afghanistan.
 Between November 1879 and February 1880 there was a civil war in Maimana between the two main contenders to the throne: Dilawar Khan and Mohammad Husain Khan. eventually Dilawar Khan emerged victorious.
 Dilawar Khan (February 1880 - 21 May 1884)
 Mohammad Husain Khan bin Mizrab Khan (21 May 1884 - 88)
 In 1888 Maimana was under Herat due to the revolt of Sardar Ishaq Khan.
 Mohammad Sharif Khan (1889-1892)

References

Former political entities in Afghanistan
1747 establishments in Asia
1892 disestablishments in Asia